Dinkey Creek is an unincorporated community in Fresno County, California. It is located on Dinkey Creek, at an elevation of 5987 feet (1825 m).

A post office operated at Dinkey Creek from 1925 to 1972. Dinkey was the name of a dog who lost a fight with a grizzly bear.

The community was home to Camp Mar-Y-Mac, which operated from 1951 to 1981.

References

Unincorporated communities in California
Unincorporated communities in Fresno County, California